Gothland may refer to:

 Gotland, older spelling Gothland, a province, county, municipality, and diocese of Sweden, and Sweden's largest island
 Götaland, also Gothland, one of three lands of Sweden, comprising ten provinces, located in the south of Sweden
 SS Gothland, a later name of the ocean liner SS Gothic (1893)

See also
Gotland (disambiguation)